Somatina ioscia is a moth of the  family Geometridae. It is found in Zimbabwe.

References

Endemic fauna of Zimbabwe
Scopulini
Lepidoptera of Zimbabwe
Moths of Sub-Saharan Africa
Moths described in 1932